Woman of the House, an album by Cherish the Ladies, was released in 2005 on the Rounder Records label.

Track listing
All songs traditional except as indicated.

 Reels: "The Jolly Seven (trad.)" / "The Rascal on the Haystack" (trad.) / "Bonkers in Yonkers" (Joanie Madden) – 3:52
 "Sweet Thames Flow Softly" (Ewan MacColl) – 5:21
 Jigs: "Carolan's Favorite Jig" / "The Rakes of Cashel" / "Highland March in Oscar and Lucinda" – 4:55
 "Bogie's Bonnie Belle" – 5:15
 "Woman of the House Medley: The Fairy Queen/The Gooseberry Bush/Paddy Kelly's/Woman of the House" – 5:18
 "The Hills of New Zealand" (Joanie Madden) – 4:43
 "Betsy Belle and Mary Gray" – 3:44
 "Fair and Tender Ladies" – 5:07
 Slip Jigs: "Paddy O'Snap" / "Robin Kelegher" / "The Cove of Cork" – 3:44
 "The Green Fields of Canada" – 6:31
 Reels: "The Old Maids of Galway" / "The Sunny Banks" / "The Flooded Road to Glenties" / "Free & Easy" – 3:43

Personnel

Cherish the Ladies
 Joanie Madden: Flute, alto flute, low & high whistles, harmony vocals
 Mary Coogan: Guitars, mandolin, banjo, banjitar, octave mandolin
 Heidi Talbot: Vocals
 Roisin Dillon: Fiddle
 Mirella Murray: Accordion

With Special Guests
 Sharon Shannon: Accordion
 Liz Kane: Fiddle
 Kate Rusby: Vocals
 Karen Matheson: Vocals
 Donna Long: Piano, harmony vocals
 Phil Cunningham: Piano, keyboards
 Laoise Kelly: Harp
 Trioná Ni Dhomhnáill: Piano
 John Joe Kelly: Bodhrán
 Phil Bowler: Upright bass, bowed bass
 James MacIntosh: Drums and percussion
 Ewan Vernal: Bass
 Donald Shaw: Wurlitzer

References

External links
 Complete identification of album contents at irishtune.info

Cherish the Ladies albums
2005 albums